Oscar Ahnfelt (1813–1882) was a Swedish singer, composer and music publisher.

The spiritual troubadour of Sweden
Ahnfelt composed the music for many of Lina Sandell's hymns.  He was a pietist, who traveled all over Scandinavia, playing his 10-string guitar and singing her lyrics.  The state church authorities did not like pietistic hymns and, anticipating a royal injunction against the singing of Sandell's songs, ordered Ahnfelt to sing them before King Karl XV. But after hearing them, the King announced to Ahnfelt, "You may sing as much as you desire in both of my kingdoms."  Ahnfelt sang them so much that Sandell wrote, "Ahnfelt has sung my songs into the hearts of the people."

Sandell–Ahnfelt hymns have spread throughout the world. Two of the best-known ones in English are Children of the Heavenly Father (Tryggare kan ingen vara)  and Day by day (Blott en dag).

Jenny Lind, known worldwide as the "Swedish Nightingale", was also a pietist and popularized Sandell's hymns in America and wherever she sang.  She additionally helped finance Ahnfelt's Andeliga Sånger (Sacred Songs), first published in 1850.

Ahnfelt died October 22, 1882 in Karlshamn, Blekinge.  He is buried in Hvilans Kyrkogård (Hvilans Cemetery) in Karlshamn.

Selected hymns 
The following hymns have melodies composed by Oscar Ahnfelt.

Blott en dag: lyrics by Lina Sandell 
Guds barn jag är: lyrics by Carl Olof Rosenius  
Herrens nåd är var morgon ny: lyrics by Lina Sandell  
I en djup, oändlig skog: lyrics by Carl Olof Rosenius    
Jag är främling: lyrics by Betty Ehrenborg and Carl Olof Rosenius.
Tänk, när en gång det töcken har försvunnit: lyrics by Carl Olof Rosenius  
Ängsliga hjärta: lyrics by Carl Olof Rosenius  
Är det sant att Jesus är min broder: lyrics by Lina Sandell

References

External links

Lina Sandell and  Oscar Ahnfelt 
Photos
Oscar Ahnfelt 01
Oscar Ahnfelt 02
Swedish and English lyrics
Oscar Ahnfelt at HymnTime
Oscar Ahnfelt at the Hymnary
Oscar Ahnfelt at Swedish Wikisource
Discographies
Oscar Ahnfelt on Victor Records
Oscar Ahnfelt at the National Library of Sweden
Streaming audio
Lina Sandell and Oscar Ahnfelt

1813 births
1882 deaths
People from Eslöv Municipality
Swedish composers
Swedish male composers
Swedish evangelicals
Swedish Lutherans
19th-century composers
19th-century Swedish male musicians
19th-century Lutherans